Separate Amenities Act, Act No 49 of 1953, formed part of the apartheid system of racial segregation in South Africa.

The Act legalized the racial segregation of public premises, vehicles and services. Only public roads and streets were excluded from the Act.The Section 3b of the Act stated that, the facilities for different races did not need to be equal, while Section 3a, made it legal not only to supply segregated facilities, but also to completely exclude people, based on their race, from public premises, vehicles or services. In practice the best facilities were reserved for whites while those for other races were inferior.

Municipalities quickly made use of the Act to pass by-laws that reserved certain areas for whites only.

On 20 June 1990, the South African Parliament voted to repeal the Act, and on 15 October 1990, it was finally repealed by the Discriminatory Legislation regarding Public Amenities Repeal Act.

A notable exception to the segregation that was implemented following the Act was the Johannesburg Zoo and Zoo Lake. Due to requirements in the "Deed of Gift", under which the land for the zoo and lake was acquired, segregation was not permitted and consequently the zoo and public park where the lake is located was open to all races from the time they were established.

References

External links 
 Reservation of Separate Amenities Act, 1953 on Wikisource

Apartheid laws in South Africa
1953 in South African law